Claudio S. Grafulla (1812–1880) was a composer in the United States during the 19th Century, most noted for martial music for regimental bands during the early days of the American Civil War.

Biography
Grafulla was born on 31 October 1812 on Menorca, an island off the coast of Spain that was occupied by the British after the Napoleonic wars. At the age of 28, he emigrated to the United States, where he became a French horn player in Napier Lothian's New York Brass Band in New York City. This band was attached to the 7th Regiment of the New York National Guard, which was honored in 1922 by John Philip Sousa's The Gallant Seventh march. In 1860, he added woodwinds to a reorganized band and continued to serve as its director  until his death at New York on 2 December 1880.

Grafulla was a quiet, unassuming man who never married; his whole life centered on his music. His remarkable technical and musical skills allowed him to become well known as a composer, often writing music to order, and as an arranger. As a director of the 7th Regiment Band, his fame spread widely.

Grafulla was a member of William Magear "Boss" Tweed's exclusive Americus Club. He performed regularly at Americus Club events, and his close relationship with Tweed is expressed on the cover of his sheet music for "Solid Men to the Front," which features a portrait of Tweed with the legend "composed and dedicated to Hon. William M. Tweed."

Grafulla composed Washington Grays in 1861 for the 8th Regiment, New York State Militia. This work has been called a march masterpiece, a band classic, and the prototype of the concert march. Showing the stylistic influence of both German and Italian marches, the march has a marvelous balance of technique and melody in a continuous flow of musical ideas. It dared to break the old formulas, however, because it has no introduction, no break strain, and no stinger.

Curiously, long after Grafulla's death, during the presidential contest of 1896, while McKinley and Bryan were debating the burning issue of a silver vs. gold monetary standard, his publishers issued a Solid Money March under the palindrome, "C.S.Allufarg".

Some of Grafulla's works, including "Parade" and "Freischutz Quickstep", were heard in the 1990 Ken Burns PBS miniseries, The Civil War.

References

External links

 
 Works of Claudio S. Grafulla, on the Library of Congress
 U.S. Marine Band Hall of Composers  on marineband.usmc.mil
 Grafulla's Favorites on newworldrecords.org

People from Menorca
American male composers
People of New York (state) in the American Civil War
1812 births
1880 deaths
Spanish emigrants to the United States
Musicians from the Balearic Islands
19th-century American composers
19th-century Spanish male musicians
United States military musicians